The 1976–77 Denver Nuggets season, is the Nuggets first season in the NBA, after nine seasons in the ABA.

In their NBA playoffs debut, the Nuggets lost to the eventual NBA champion Portland Trail Blazers in six games in the First Round.

Offseason

ABA-NBA merger

With the conclusion of the 1975–76 season, the American Basketball Association came to an end with the ABA-NBA merger.  Four ABA teams entered the NBA: the Nuggets, the Indiana Pacers, the New York Nets and the San Antonio Spurs.  The other ABA teams were folded prior to the merger except for the Kentucky Colonels and Spirits of St. Louis, both of which were folded as part of the league merger.

The Nuggets and the other ABA teams were given harsh obstacles as part of their entry to the NBA.  Each team had to pay an entry fee; for the Nuggets it was $3.2 million.  The Denver and the other four ABA team also received no television money for their first three NBA seasons in the NBA, were not allowed to participate in the 1976 NBA draft, had to be classified as "expansion franchises" (despite longer histories and more success than many NBA teams) and had to go for two years without any vote regarding the distribution of NBA gate receipts or the realignment of NBA divisions.

The Nuggets moved from the ABA to the NBA's Midwest Division.

NBA Draft

As part of the terms of the ABA-NBA merger the Nuggets were prohibited from participating in both the 1976 NBA draft of college players and in the dispersal draft of ABA players from teams that did not enter the NBA.

Roster

Regular season

Season standings

Record vs. opponents

Playoffs

|- align="center" bgcolor="#ffcccc"
| 1
| April 20
| Portland
| L 100–101
| Dan Issel (28)
| Paul Silas (11)
| Ted McClain (5)
| McNichols Sports Arena17,995
| 0–1
|- align="center" bgcolor="#ccffcc"
| 2
| April 23
| Portland
| W 121–110
| Dan Issel (36)
| Paul Silas (9)
| Jones, McClain (7)
| McNichols Sports Arena17,975
| 1–1
|- align="center" bgcolor="#ffcccc"
| 3
| April 24
| @ Portland
| L 106–110
| David Thompson (40)
| Jones, Issel (9)
| Bobby Jones (5)
| Memorial Coliseum12,736
| 1–2
|- align="center" bgcolor="#ffcccc"
| 4
| April 26
| @ Portland
| L 96–105
| Mack Calvin (28)
| Jones, Silas (8)
| Paul Silas (4)
| Memorial Coliseum12,930
| 1–3
|- align="center" bgcolor="#ccffcc"
| 5
| May 1
| Portland
| W 114–105 (OT)
| David Thompson (31)
| Dan Issel (18)
| Jim Price (11)
| McNichols Sports Arena17,517
| 2–3
|- align="center" bgcolor="#ffcccc"
| 6
| May 2
| @ Portland
| L 92–108
| David Thompson (17)
| Marvin Webster (16)
| Ted McClain (7)
| Memorial Coliseum12,924
| 2–4
|-

Awards, records, and honors
 David Thompson, All-NBA First Team
 Bobby Jones, NBA All-Defensive First Team

References

 Nuggets on Basketball Reference

Denver Nuggets seasons
Denver
Denver Nuggets
Denver Nuggets